Major General Ashraf Rashid (Punjabi) (23 May 1948 – 2 October 2004) was a two-star general in the Pakistan Army and the colonel commandant of the Special Service Group division within the Pakistan Army from October 1995 to September 1999. A career army special forces officer, he was responsible for conducting paramilitary operations and infiltrating Kashmiri militants on the Indian side of the Line of Control, which subsequently led to the Kargil War. He resigned from his post in September 1999 following the intense pressure on Pakistan from international community to withdraw its military forces from Kargil.

Military career
Ashraf Rashid joined the Pakistan Army in 1964 and had participated in Indo-Pakistani War of 1965 as a Junior non-commissioned officer (JNCO). Rashid entered the Pakistan Military Academy in 1966. He graduated two years later and joined the Pakistan Army at the rank of lieutenant.

He was selected for the SSG unit, and was sent to the United States to the U.S. Special Forces training school to complete his training. Rashid graduated from the Command and General Staff College in Fort Leavenworth, Kansas.

He served in the Indo-Pakistani War of 1971 and participated in the conflict as a captain, during which he was permanently injured on the right cheek. As a special service officer, Rashid was promoted as a Brigadier-General and was later sent to Siachen where he along with then-Brigadier-General Parvez Musharraf, participated in the conflict.

In 1995, he was promoted to Major General and was made commandant of his unit. He was instrumental in conducting paramilitary operations and infiltrating Kashmiri militants in the Kargil War. He resigned from his position and left the special forces as the failure of Kargil operation which he was widely blamed for.

Before becoming Commander of the Special Service Group commando division, Rashid was Director General of Military Operations, succeeding Jehangir Karamat, who became Chief of Army Staff.

Kargil War and resignation
As head of the Special Service Group, the special operations division, Rashid helped Kashmiri militants infiltrate the Indian side of the line of control in the Kargil district of Kashmir, where his division conducted covert operations. Only Rashid, then army chief of staff Pervez Musharraf and two other generals knew about the operation.

The event marked the beginning of the Kargil War, which ended with defeat and eventual withdrawal of the Pakistan Army from their occupied positions in Kargil. After being pressured by the US. Rashid's role in initiating the conflict and increased political pressure led to his resignation in September 1999.

Death
General Rashid died of a heart attack in his home in Lahore, on 2 October 2004.

See also

References

1948 births
2004 deaths
Military personnel from Lahore
Punjabi people
Pakistani Sunni Muslims
Pakistani generals
Special Services Group officers
People of the Kargil War
Non-U.S. alumni of the Command and General Staff College